The Leidsegracht is a canal in Amsterdam, the Netherlands.
It is a cross-canal in Amsterdam-Center that connects Herengracht, Keizersgracht, Prinsengracht and Lijnbaansgracht and flows into the Singelgracht at Marnixstraat.

History

The Leidsegracht was part of the Expansion of Amsterdam and marked the border between the first and the second phase of the construction of the Grachtengordel (canal belt). 
Between 1615 and 1658, the Leidsegracht was the southern boundary of the city. 
The canal got its name in 1658 and is named after the city of Leiden.

Cornelis Lely (1854–1929), the hydraulic engineer, governor and minister who made the original plans for the reclamation of the Zuiderzee, was born on Leidsegracht no. 39.
He is depicted on a gable stone between the Zuiderzee and the new IJsselmeer.

Pieter Goemans was inspired to write the classic song Aan de Amsterdamse grachten (On the Amsterdam canals) in 1949 while walking across the bridge where the Prinsengracht and the Leidsegracht intersect.

Almost all canal houses and former warehouses on this canal are now houses.

See also 
Canals of Amsterdam

Notes

Sources

External link
 Die Verheelinghe; geschiedenis van de Leidsegracht e.o., www.theobakker.net

Canals in Amsterdam